Antonio Marcel (Tony) Green is a drift and rally sport driver from New Zealand.

Biography
Green migrated to the United Kingdom in May 1999. There he worked as a professional motorsport driver coach with the Ford Rallye Academy, Drive and Survive Rally School, and PalmerSport.  He has coached private and corporate clients, training rally, drift and race drivers all over the world. In 2001 he drove into 8th place in the Safari Rally of Kenya with Kenyan, Taylor Orson, as his co-driver.

From 2002 to 2004 Green competed in various competitions throughout the UK, placing 3rd in the Autocar sideways challenge and driving in the British Trial & Rally Drivers Association Red Dragon Rally B10 class in his privately built and entered AE86 Toyota Corolla.

In 2005 Green competed in 6 rounds of the British Rally Championship with the Bourne 2 Rally Team. After obtaining his international rally licence, he competed in the World Rally Championship round in Wales that year but did not finish crashing out in special stage 7.

In 2006 Green obtained his D1 drifting licence and drove in the D1GB drift series. He was invited a demonstration round at Circuit de Barcelona-Catalunya in the first drift demonstration in Europe.  Green was also given the opportunity to demonstrates Prodrive's Group N12 Subaru Legacy in the final round of the China Rally Championship that year.

In 2007 he competed in European Drift Championship finishing 6th overall at the end of the season.  In 2008 Green secured a contract with the Chinese rally team FCACA with Australian John Allen as his co-driver. Also in 2008 he entered the Rally of New Zealand driving an Autotek Subaru WRX STi with Allen. He had won the last round of the China Rally championship that year.

Green competed in the 2009 Asia Pacific Rally Championship again with Allen as co-driver. They drove a N4 Mitsubishi Lancer Evo 9.

Competition history

Non-Competitive events

References

External links 
Biography at BourneSideways.com

New Zealand rally drivers
Year of birth missing (living people)
Living people